Carlos Carrasco (born April 5, 1948) is a Panamanian-American actor who has appeared in film, television and video games.

Career
Born in Panama City, Panama, Carrasco traveled to the United States on an acting scholarship to Stephens College in Columbia, Missouri. After subsequent study at the University of Illinois and Wayne State University in Detroit, he began his professional career in New York City, making his Broadway debut in the Circle-in-the-Square's production of "The National Health." Extensive stage work followed, including appearances at many of the country's regional theaters such as the Hartford Stage Company, Atlanta's Alliance Theater and Los Angeles' Mark Taper Forum.

Pursuing a parallel career in arts administration, Carrasco has been Executive Director of the Hispanic Organization of Latin Actors in New York, a panelist for the New York State Council on the Arts and a co-director of the JACK Arts Ensemble based in Los Angeles.

Partial filmography
 1980 Search for Tomorrow (TV Series) as Detective Hewitt
 1988 Crocodile Dundee II as Garcia
 1990 The Return of Superfly as Hector Estrada
 1991 The Fisher King as Doctor
 1992 In the Heat of Passion as Perez
 1992 Nails (TV Movie) as Jose Acosta
 1992 Fievel's American Tails (TV Series) as Jorge (voice)
 1993 Blood In Blood Out as "Popeye"
 1994 Speed as Ortiz
 1994–1998 Star Trek: Deep Space Nine (TV Series) as Krole / Klingon Officer / D'Ghor
 1995 As Good as Dead (TV Movie) as Eddie Garcia
 1995 ER (TV Series) as Dominican Uncle
 1995 MADtv (1995, TV Series) as IZM Terrorist
 1995–1996 Can't Hurry Love (TV Series) as Alfredo
 1996 The Glass Cage as Homer
 1996 Lifeform as Sergeant Lopez
 1996 Dark Breed as Fox
 1997 Star Trek: Voyager (Episode: "Fair Trade') as Bahrat
 1997 Eruption as Marcos
 1998 Anarchy TV as Clarence
 1999 One Man's Hero as Dominguez
 1999 Angel (TV Series) as Dr. Vinpur Narpudan
 2000 Across the Line as Franco
 2001 Double Take as Captain Garcia
 2002 Icewind Dale II (Video Game) as Malavon Despana (voice)
 2002 Confessions of a Dangerous Mind as Brazioni
 2004 Grand Theft Auto: San Andreas (Video Game) as Pedestrian (voice)
 2005 Resident Evil 4 (Video Game) as Villagers & Zealots (English version, voice)
 2006 The Virgin of Juarez as Bus Driver
 2009 CSI: Crime Scene Investigation as Esteban Fellipe
 2009 Parks and Recreation (Episode: "Sister City") as Antonio
 2010 The Space Between as Bus Driver
 2011 Without Men as Military Man
 2011 Coming & Going as Official
 2011 Jurassic Park: The Game (Video Game) as Oscar Morales (voice)
 2013 Parker as Norte
 2014 Futurestates (TV Series) as Hal
 2016 Star Trek: Progeny (TV Series) as Captain Jonas Bensley
 2016 Sienna's Choice as Hugo
 2017 All About the Money as General Chavez
 2017 Fight Your Way Out as Alfonso "Panama" Aguilar
 2018 The P.I.M.P. as Guerrilla Camp Chief
 2019 Turnover as Miguel
 2019 Diablo Rojo PTY as Miguel Moreno

References

External links

1948 births
Living people
People from Panama City
American male film actors
American male television actors
American male video game actors
Hispanic and Latino American male actors
Panamanian emigrants to the United States
Place of birth missing (living people)
Stephens College alumni
University of Illinois Urbana-Champaign alumni
Wayne State University alumni
20th-century American male actors
21st-century American male actors

pt:A Fazenda 3#Participantes